Two Brothers is the debut studio album of Boxhead Ensemble, released on August 21, 2001 through Atavistic Records.

Track listing

Personnel 
Boxhead Ensemble
Jessica Billey – violin
Ryan Hembrey – bass guitar
Glenn Kotche – drums
Michael Krassner – musical direction, mixing
Fred Lonberg-Holm – cello, nyckelharpa
Scott Tuma – guitar
Production and additional personnel
David Michael Curry – viola
Steve Dorocke – guitar
Gerald Dowd – drums
Joe Ferguson – engineering
Guillermo Gregorio – reeds
Mike Hagler – mastering
Braden King – design
Jeff Parker – guitar
Andrew Sopko – cover art
Mick Turner – guitar
Jeff Tweedy – guitar
Jim White – drums

References 

2001 albums
Atavistic Records albums
Boxhead Ensemble albums